The University News, or U-News, is an independent student newspaper at the University of Missouri–Kansas City.  It publishes weekly, during the school semester, and averages sixteen issues per semester, with an additional issue during the summer.

External links
kcroonews.com

University of Missouri–Kansas City
Student newspapers published in Missouri